Gustav Gocke (17 February 1919 – 9 February 2005) was a German wrestler. He competed in two events at the 1952 Summer Olympics.

References

External links
 

1919 births
2005 deaths
German male sport wrestlers
Olympic wrestlers of Germany
Wrestlers at the 1952 Summer Olympics
Sportspeople from Dortmund